Powerex may refer to:

 Powerex (electricity), a Vancouver-based wholesale energy marketing company and a wholly owned subsidiary of BC Hydro
 Powerex Inc (semiconductors), a Pennsylvania-based semiconductor company